Frederick Hermann Kisch CBE, CB, DSO (23 August 1888 – 7 April 1943) was a decorated British Army officer and Zionist leader. A Brigadier, he was the highest ranking Jew to serve in the British Army.

Early military service
Frederick Kisch was born to a British-Jewish family in the town of Darjeeling, British Empire in India, on 23 August 1888, where his father Michael was head of the Indian Postal Service. After some time, Kisch family moved back to England, where Frederick attended Clifton College and subsequently the Royal Military Academy Sandhurst. He joined the Royal Engineers in 1909 and served with them in the First World War in France and the Middle East theatres.

During his war service, he was wounded three times, and decorated with Distinguished Service Order for gallantry in action. He was also decorated by the government of France with the Croix de guerre with Palm. Due to his wounds, he was declared temporarily unfit for frontline service and was subsequently transferred to the Military Intelligence Corps, where he served for the rest of the war. He also served as general staff officer to General Sir George Macdonogh. During the war, he reached the rank of lieutenant-colonel.

He was appointed a member of the British delegation to the 1919 Paris Peace Conference.

Interwar period
He joined the Zionist Organization in 1922, where he headed the political department until being succeeded by Chaim Arlosoroff. He also served as Zionist Commission head for the Jerusalem region between 1923 and 1931. His British military background allowed him to cultivate excellent relations with the British administration of Mandatory Palestine as well as Arab leaders including Sharif Hussein of Mecca and his son King Abdullah I of Jordan. Kisch was awarded the Order of Wen-Hu (4th Class) by the Republic of China in 1921.

Second World War
Kisch was recalled to active service in 1939 at the outbreak of the Second World War. He was promoted to the rank of brigadier and assigned to the British Eighth Army, where he became commanding officer of the Royal Engineers in the North African Campaign.

Kisch was killed in Tunisia on 7 April 1943 when he stepped on a landmine during the Battle of Wadi Akarit. He had been organising reconstruction of bridge, essential to the Allied advance.

Legacy
Ya’ar Kisch/Kisch Memorial Forest, moshav Kfar Kisch and various streets, including Sderot Kisch on the Carmel in Haifa, are among places named after him. In 2015, his grandson Yoav was elected to the Knesset and as Minister of Education and Minister of Regional Cooperation since December 2022.

Bibliography 

 Frederick Hermann Kisch, Palestine Diary; with a Foreword by the Rt Hon. D. Lloyd George. Gollancz, 1938.
 Norman Bentwich & Michael Kisch, Brigadier Frederick Kisch. Vallentine Mitchell, London, 1966.

References

External links
British Army Officers 1939−1945
Generals of World War II

1888 births
1943 deaths
Jews in Mandatory Palestine
People from Darjeeling
Zionists
British military personnel of the 1936–1939 Arab revolt in Palestine
Royal Engineers officers
British Army brigadiers of World War II
British Army personnel of World War I
British Army personnel killed in World War II
British Jews
Commanders of the Order of the British Empire
Companions of the Order of the Bath
Companions of the Distinguished Service Order
Officiers of the Légion d'honneur
Recipients of the Croix de Guerre 1914–1918 (France)
Heads of the Jewish Agency for Israel
Jewish Agency for Israel
Landmine victims
Military personnel of British India
Intelligence Corps officers
People educated at Clifton College